Gemmula lisajoni is a species of sea snail, a marine gastropod mollusk in the family Turridae, the turrids.

Description
The length of the shell varies between 20 mm and 35 mm. It has a brown spire with a distinctive purplish-violet siphonal canal.

It is related to Gemmula ambara Olivera et al., 2008 and Gemmula rosario Shikama, 1977

Distribution
This marine species occurs off the Philippines.

References

 Olivera BM. The subfamily Turrinae in the Philippines: the genus Turris (Röding, 1798). Phil J Sci 1999; 128: 295-318

External links
 Gastropods.com: Gemmula (Gemmula) lisajoni
  Tucker, J.K. 2004 Catalog of recent and fossil turrids (Mollusca: Gastropoda). Zootaxa 682:1-1295.

lisajoni
Gastropods described in 1999